Ramos, officially the Municipality of Ramos, is a 5th class municipality in the province of Tarlac, Philippines. According to the 2020 census, it has a population of 22,879 people.

Etymology
Ramos, formerly named Bani, was a barrio of the town of Paniqui from 1878 to December 31, 1920. On January 1, 1921, Bani became a town and was renamed "Ramos" in memory of Gov. Alfonso Ramos who first initiated the creation of the town.

Geography

Barangays
Ramos is politically subdivided into 9 barangays.

 Coral-Iloco
 Guiteb
 Pance
 Poblacion Center
 Poblacion North
 Poblacion South
 San Juan
 San Raymundo
 Toledo

Climate

Demographics

Economy

References

External links

Ramos Profile at PhilAtlas.com
Official Website 
Visit Ramos, Tarlac
[ Philippine Standard Geographic Code]
Philippine Census Information

Municipalities of Tarlac